Kiril Dimitrov Vasilev (born 7 March 1967 in Pazardzhik) is a Bulgarian former football forward. He ended his career at the end of 2000–01 season.

He made his debut for Hebar Pazardzhik. In 1991, he was part of the Bulgarian national football team.
He also played for Haskovo, Lokomotiv Sofia, Levski Kyustendil and Lokomotiv Plovdiv.

References

External links
https://www.national-football-teams.com/player/26963/Kiril_Vasilev.html

1967 births
Living people
Bulgarian footballers
FC Lokomotiv 1929 Sofia players
PFC Lokomotiv Plovdiv players
First Professional Football League (Bulgaria) players
Second Professional Football League (Bulgaria) players
FC Haskovo players
FC Lokomotiv Gorna Oryahovitsa players
FC Hebar Pazardzhik players
Bulgaria international footballers